Marhinde Verkerk (born 21 November 1985) is a retired Dutch judoka.

Career
Verkerk won the World Judo Championships Women's −78 kg in 2009, in her hometown of Rotterdam. In 2013, she won silver at the World Championships in Rio de Janeiro, Brazil, and then in 2015, she won the bronze medal.

She competed at the 2012 Summer Olympics in the -78 kg event.  She lost to Gemma Gibbons in the quarter-finals and then to Mayra Aguiar in her bronze medal match.

After winning silver, bronze and again silver at the European Championships in 2010, 2013 and 2014, respectively, Verkerk finally won European gold in 2015. As the European Championships were held during the 2015 European Games, this also meant she won the inaugural gold medal in the women's −78 kg division at these championships.

References

External links
 
 
 

1985 births
Living people
Dutch female judoka
European Games gold medalists for the Netherlands
European Games medalists in judo
Judoka at the 2012 Summer Olympics
Judoka at the 2016 Summer Olympics
Judoka at the 2015 European Games
Olympic judoka of the Netherlands
Sportspeople from Rotterdam
World judo champions
Judoka at the 2019 European Games
21st-century Dutch women